Narysh is a rural locality (a selo) in Mekheltinsky Selsoviet, Gumbetovsky District, Republic of Dagestan, Russia. The population was 451 as of 2010.

Geography 
Narysh is located 128 km north of Mekhelta (the district's administrative centre) by road. Germenchik and Pervomayskoye are the nearest rural localities.

References 

Rural localities in Gumbetovsky District